In Flight is a live album by Alvin Lee & Co. It was released in 1974 by Columbia Records.

Track listing

All songs written by Alvin Lee unless otherwise stated.

Side 1 

 "Got to Keep Moving" - 5:02
 "Going Through the Door" - 4:21
 "Don't Be Cruel" (Elvis Presley, Otis Blackwell) - 2:39
 "Money Honey" (Jesse Stone) - 3:05
 "I'm Writing You a Letter" - 4:52

Side 2 

 "You Need Love Love Love" - 5:24
 "Freedom for the Stallion" (Allen Toussaint) - 6:26
 "Every Blues You've Ever Heard" - 5:24
 "All Life's Trials" - 2:59

Side 3 

 "Intro" (Alvin Lee & Company) - :53
 "Let's Get Back" - 4:58
 "Ride My Train" - 4:14
 "There's a Feeling" - 4:02
 "Running Round" - 5:38

Side 4 

 "Mystery Train" (Herman Parker Jr., Sam Phillips) - 4:42
 "Slow Down" (Larry Williams) - 3:38
 "Keep a Knockin'" (Richard Penniman) - 2:14
 "How Many Times" - 2:04
 "I've Got Eyes for You Baby" - 3:36
 "I'm Writing You a Letter" - 4:18

Bonus Tracks not on original LP

 "Somebody Callin' Me" - 6:26
 "Put It in a Box" - 8:06

Personnel
 Alvin Lee  -  lead vocals, lead guitar
 Mel Collins  -  saxophones, flute
 Neil Hubbard - rhythm guitar
 Tim Hinkley  -  keyboards
 Alan Spenner  -  bass
 Ian Wallace  -  drums
 Dyan Birch, Frank Collins, Paddie McHugh - backing vocals
Technical
Andy Jaworski, Harold Burgon - recording engineer
Alvin Lee - mixing
Roger Lowe - design, layout
Terry O'Neill - front cover photography

Additional notes
Catalogue: (LP) Columbia 32729, (CD) Repertoire 4702

References

External links 
 

1974 live albums
Columbia Records live albums
Alvin Lee albums